Cuyahoga County Airport , also known as Robert D. Shea Field, is a public use airport in northeastern Cuyahoga County, Ohio, United States. Owned and operated by Cuyahoga County since 1946, it also serves Lake County and Geauga County. The airport is located 10 nautical miles (12 mi, 19 km) east of downtown Cleveland and sits on the border of three cities: Highland Heights, Richmond Heights and Willoughby Hills. It is included in the National Plan of Integrated Airport Systems for 2011–2015, which categorized it as a general aviation reliever airport for Cleveland Hopkins International Airport.

History 
Developed in 1928 by Curtiss Wright and operated until closed a privately owned airport in 1930. The airport site remained inactive until nearly the end of World War II. In the spring of 1946, the voters of Cuyahoga County approved a general obligation bond issue for the acquisition of the airport in the amount of $510,000. They purchased the Curtiss Wright Field in December 1946.  
In September 1949, the 271-acre Curtiss Wright Field, also known as the Richmond Road Airport, was opened for business. The county officially opened the airport on May 30, 1950. 
In the late 1950s, Cuyahoga County hired an engineering firm to develop a master plan for the future of the airport. The plan, created in 1956, called for two runways, hangar facilities and other service area developments for private and business aviation. Shortly thereafter, major expansion of the County Airport began. It included the construction of the first runway in 1959 and later its expansion in 1962. Further development included the acquisition and installation of instrument approach facilities, the construction of a concrete apron and a paved entry road.
In the 1960s, the airport's first two fixed-base operators moved in. The growth of air traffic prompted various Airport improvements, and an additional study of land use on and adjacent to the airport. In 1970, The County purchased a mobile air traffic control tower and opened one of the only "non‑federal" control towers in the United States. The facility was taken over by the FAA on May 15, 1971. 
By the 1980s development of the adjacent land into office space and an industrial park had begun. In 1984, an office building was constructed on the flight line and soon became known as the Destination Building. Expansion of the Airport Industrial Park and Curtis Wright Corporate Center II continued throughout the 1990s.
On October 31, 1991, Aviation Administrator Robert D. Shea, retired after 42 years of dedicated service. In tribute, Cuyahoga County changed the name of the airport to Cuyahoga County Airport, Robert D. Shea Field.
In 2003 the Airport Division, now under the auspices of the Cuyahoga County Department of Development, was awarded an FAA grant to assist with a Master Plan Update and Runway Safety Area Study Project.

Airlines and destinations

Cargo

Facilities and aircraft 
Cuyahoga County Airport covers an area of 640 acres (259 ha) at an elevation of 879 feet (268 m) above mean sea level. It has one runway designated 6/24 with an asphalt surface measuring 5,102 by 100 feet (1,555 x 30 m).

The facilities includes 6 office buildings in the industrial park, an administrative safety and service complex, 15 hangar facilities and 2 tie down areas to accommodate the 133 based aircraft, a flight school, US Customs, an FAA air traffic control tower, an 18-hole golf course and an employee base in excess of 2000.

For the 12-month period ending August 17, 2010, the airport had 67,662 aircraft operations, an average of 185 per day: 80% general aviation, 20% air taxi, and <1% military. At that time there were 133 aircraft based at this airport: 44% single-engine, 42% jet, 12% multi-engine, and 2% helicopter.

Businesses 
 Air Z Flying Service
 Private charter service
 Aircraft Maintenance Inc.
 Aircraft maintenance
 Cleveland Jet Center
 Hangars, terminal lounge, aircraft cleaning/maintenance
 Flexjet
 Flight Options
 Nextant Aerospace
 T&G Flying Club
 Flight school, aircraft rental, aircraft management

References

External links

 Cuyahoga County Airport
 Cleveland Jet Center, the fixed-base operator (FBO)
 Aerial image as of October 2001 from USGS The National Map
 
 

Airports in Ohio
Transportation buildings and structures in Cuyahoga County, Ohio
Transportation buildings and structures in Lake County, Ohio